Andrew Robert Sussex (born 23 November 1964) is an English retired professional footballer.

Playing career
Beginning as an apprentice at Leyton Orient, Sussex turned professional in 1981 and made nearly 150 league appearances. He signed for Crewe Alexandra in 1988, where he made over 100 league appearances in three seasons. Sussex then signed for Southend United in 1991, making nearly 100 league appearances. He spent time on loan at Brentford, before playing non-league football with Canvey Island and Grays Athletic.

References

1964 births
Living people
People from the London Borough of Islington
English footballers
Association football forwards
Leyton Orient F.C. players
Crewe Alexandra F.C. players
Southend United F.C. players
Brentford F.C. players
Canvey Island F.C. players
Grays Athletic F.C. players
English Football League players